Betty Thomas (born Betty Lucille Nienhauser; July 27, 1947) is an American actress, director, and producer. She is known for her Emmy Award-winning role as Sergeant Lucy Bates on the television series Hill Street Blues. As of March 2018, Thomas is one of just two directors (and the only solo director) to have multiple films on the list of seventeen highest-US-grossing female-directed films. Additionally, two of her films are in the top twenty-five highest-US-grossing female-directed films.

Early life
Thomas was born Betty Lucille Nienhauser in St. Louis, Missouri, in 1947 to Nancy (née Brown) and William H. Nienhauser, Sr. She graduated from Willoughby South High School, Willoughby, Ohio, in 1965. After high school Thomas attended Ohio University in Athens, Ohio, and graduated with a Bachelor of Fine Arts degree. Upon graduating Thomas worked as an artist and taught high school before becoming a part of The Second City, the premiere venue for improvisational theater in Chicago.

Second City
Thomas came to her entertainment career by a circuitous route. While working as an artist and school teacher, she became a waitress at The Second City to earn extra cash for a trip abroad. While waiting on tables, Thomas was encouraged to try out for the troupe, and subsequently joined the company.

She was praised for her brassy and outspoken performances, and became the first woman to direct one of their MainStage theatre productions. Thomas also worked with several up and coming Second City alumni, most notably Bill Murray. When The Second City opened a Los Angeles branch, Thomas moved west. She later reunited with some of the Second City cast members when she appeared as special guest star in a 1983 episode of SCTV.

Career

Acting career
Upon her arrival in Los Angeles, Thomas received many bit parts in low-budget films like Chesty Anderson, USN (1976), the Robert Zemeckis film Used Cars (1980) as well as sketch comedy films like Tunnel Vision (1975), and Loose Shoes (1980), the latter of which featured Second City classmate Bill Murray. She also appeared in the 1989 film Troop Beverly Hills, starring Shelley Long.

While Thomas had been building her career in comedy, her breakthrough role as an actress came when she was cast in the role of police officer (later Sergeant) Lucy Bates on the TV series Hill Street Blues (1981–87). Over the course of the series her character goes from inexperienced rookie to confident sergeant. She received seven Emmy nominations for best supporting actress, and took home the award for the 1984–85 season.

Directing career
After having lied to a Variety reporter about planning on directing a Hooperman episode, she was given a real opportunity by the show's executive producer, and from there her directing career began. After making several other acting appearances, Thomas began directing episodes of Hooperman in addition to the premiere episodes of Doogie Howser, M.D. in 1989. She went on to direct episodes of Arresting Behavior and several episodes of the HBO series  Dream On, the latter of which earned her an Emmy for best director. Thomas is nicknamed "The Midnight Queen" because of her preference for nighttime shoots.

In 1992 Thomas took the next step in her directing career with her feature debut Only You. A slight, playful romantic comedy, Only You was a departure from Thomas's experience on Hill Street Blues or her subsequent television directing. Wayne Rice, the film's producer and screenwriter, said that Thomas was chosen to direct due in part to the film's plot in which a man is on a hapless quest to find the perfect woman. He felt it would be considered inherently sexist without a female director.

Three years following the release of Only You, Thomas directed The Brady Bunch Movie (1995), a satirical vision of the 1970s television series The Brady Bunch. The Brady Bunch Movie was a box office hit with domestic ticket sales of $46,576,136, nearly quadrupling its $12 million budget and making it at the time one of the highest-grossing films directed by a woman.

She followed The Brady Bunch Movie with other successes, including Private Parts (1997), Dr. Dolittle (1998), 28 Days (2000), and John Tucker Must Die (2006).  The 2009 film Alvin and the Chipmunks: The Squeakquel became the first female-directed picture to gross more than $200 million and made her the most successful woman director up to that time at the box office. In 2012, Thomas directed a low-budget online series called Audrey for the WIGS YouTube channel. In 1998, her Tall Trees productions company was signed to a first look deal with Columbia Pictures.

In 2001, Thomas won the Dorothy Arzner Directors Award of the Women in Film Crystal + Lucy Awards, presented by the Los Angeles chapter of the Women in Film Organization.

Filmography

Film

Television 
TV series 

TV movies

Acting roles

References

External links

Betty Thomas Biography on Tribute.ca
Betty Thomas on The Second City
Betty Thomas on Alliance of Women Directors

Living people
20th-century American actresses
American film actresses
Film producers from Missouri
American television actresses
American television directors
American women film directors
Comedy film directors
American women television directors
Film directors from Missouri
Ohio University alumni
Actresses from St. Louis
Outstanding Performance by a Supporting Actress in a Drama Series Primetime Emmy Award winners
American women film producers
21st-century American women
1948 births